Bridge of Mizarela is a medieval bridge that crosses the Rio Rabagão, between the civil parish of Ruivães (municipality of Vieira do Minho) and civil parish of Ferral (in the municipality of Montalegre), the Portuguese district of Braga.

History
It was built in the Middle Ages and was reconstructed in the beginning of the 19th century.

According to a local legend, it was built by the Devil himself.

The bridge was nicknamed "Saltador" ("jumper").

Marshal Soult's army crossed the bridge on 17 May 1809 during the French retreat from Porto.  Portuguese militia had refused to destroy the bridge, opting to barricade it instead. Major Dulong of the 31st Léger led the assault on the bridge, clearing the French army's escape to Spain.

Characteristics
It is implemented in an escarpment, set in rocks with some altitude relative to the riverbed.

See also
List of bridges in Portugal

References

Mizarela
Buildings and structures in Montalegre
Pedestrian bridges in Portugal
Vieira do Minho
Listed bridges in Portugal